Psilopsocidae is a family of Psocodea (formerly Psocoptera) belonging to the infraorder Psocetae. Members of the family have a free areola postica and mottled wings. It is the only psocopteran family with records of wood-boring species. The family comprises one genus and seven species.

References

 Lienhard, C. & Smithers, C. N. 2002. Psocoptera (Insecta): World Catalogue and Bibliography. Instrumenta Biodiversitatis, vol. 5. Muséum d'histoire naturelle, Genève.

Psocoptera families
Psocetae